Thomas Allen Spinks, known as Tommy Spinks (October 29, 1948 – August 26, 2007), was an American football wide receiver. He played college football for the Louisiana Tech Bulldogs.

Spinks set two records in the 1968 Grantland Rice Bowl, when he caught 12 passes for 167 yards. After his Tech career, Spinks was selected in the 1970 NFL Draft by the Minnesota Vikings, but never played in an NFL game. Spinks was inducted into the Louisiana Tech University Athletic Hall of Fame in 1988.

References

 "Tech Gridders Feted", Ruston Daily Leader, January 21, 1970

External links
 
 Tech Legend Spinks Passes Away

1948 births
2007 deaths
Players of American football from Shreveport, Louisiana
Sportspeople from Arlington, Texas
American health care businesspeople
Louisiana Tech Bulldogs football players
American magazine publishers (people)
Minnesota Vikings players
Deaths from cancer in Texas
American United Methodists
20th-century Methodists
21st-century Methodists